Shing Yan is one of the 39 constituencies in the Yuen Long District.

Created for the 2019 District Council elections, the constituency returns one district councillor to the Yuen Long District Council, with an election every four years.

Shing Yan loosely covers housing estates including part of Tin Shing Court and Ping Yan Court in Tin Shui Wai. It has projected population of 12,903.

Councillors represented

Election results

2010s

References

Tin Shui Wai
Constituencies of Hong Kong
Constituencies of Yuen Long District Council
2019 establishments in Hong Kong
Constituencies established in 2019